Ariophantidae is a taxonomic family of air-breathing land snails and semi-slugs, terrestrial pulmonate gastropod mollusks in the superfamily Helicarionoidea (according to the taxonomy of the Gastropoda by Bouchet & Rocroi, 2005).

Distribution 
The distribution of the family Ariophantidae includes India and south-eastern Asia.

Anatomy 
Snails within this family make and use love darts made of chitin.

In this family, the number of haploid chromosomes lies between 21 and 25 and also lies between 31 and 35, but other values are also possible (according to the values in this table).

Taxonomy

Subfamilies
The family Ariophantidae consists of 3 subfamilies:
 Ariophantinae Godwin-Austen, 1888 - synonyms: Naninidae Pfeffer, 1878 (inv.); Hemiplectinae Gude & B. B. Woodward, 1921
 Macrochlamydinae Godwin-Austen, 1888 - synonyms: Tanychlamydinae H. B. Baker, 1928; Vitrinulini Schileyko, 2003
 Ostracolethinae Simroth, 1901 - synonyms: Parmarioninae Godwin-Austen, 1908; Laocaiini Schileyko, 2002; Microparmarionini Schileyko, 2003; Myotestidae Collinge, 1902

Genera 
The following genera are recognised in the family Ariophantidae:
Ariophantinae
 Ariophanta Des Moulins, 1829 - type genus of the family Ariophantidae
 Bapuia Godwin-Austen, 1918
 Cryptogirasia Cockerell, 1891
 Cryptozona Mörch, 1872
 Dalingia Godwin-Austen, 1907
 Dihangia Godwin-Austen, 1916
 Euplecta C. Semper, 1870
 Galongia Godwin-Austen, 1916
 Hemiplecta Albers, 1850
 Indrella Godwin-Austen, 1901
 Khasiella Godwin-Austen, 1899
 Mariaella Gray, 1855
 Megaustenia Cockerell, 1912
 Ratnadvipia Godwin-Austen, 1899 - endemic to Sri Lanka
 Ravana Godwin-Austen, 1901
 Schwammeria Schileyko, 2010
 Sitalinopsis Thiele, 1931
 Taphrospira W. T. Blanford, 1904
 Xesta Albers, 1850
Macrochlamydinae
 Baiaplecta Laidlaw, 1956
 Himalodiscus Kuznetsov, 1996
 Macrochlamys Gray, 1847 - type genus of the subfamily Macrochlamydinae
 Microcystina Mörch, 1872
 Oxytesta Zilch, 1956
 Parvatella W. T. Blanford & Godwin-Austen, 1908
 Rahula Godwin-Austen, 1907
 Sakiella Godwin-Austen, 1908
 Sarika Godwin-Austen, 1907
 Sesara Albers, 1860
 Syama W. T. Blanford & Godwin-Austen, 1908
 Tadunia Godwin-Austen, 1918
 Taphrenalla Pholyotha & Panha, 2021
 Varadia Bhosale & Raheem, 2021
 Vitrinula Gray, 1857

Ostracolethinae
 Apoparmarion Collinge, 1902
 Cambodiparmarion Kuznetsov & Kuzminykh, 1999
 Cryptosemelus Collinge, 1902
 Damayantia Issel, 1874
 Damayantiella Zilch, 1959
 Isselentia Collinge, 1901
 Microparmarion Simroth, 1893
 Minyongia Godwin-Austen, 1916
 Ostracolethe Simroth, 1901 - type genus of the subfamily Ostracolethinae
 Paraparmarion Collinge, 1902
 Parmarion P. Fischer, 1855
 Parmunculus Collinge, 1899
 Philippinella Möllendorff, 1899
 Wiegmannia Collinge, 1901
Subfamily not assigned
 Falsiplecta Schileyko & Semenyuk, 2018

Cladogram 
The following cladogram shows the phylogenic relationships of this family with other families in the limacoid clade:

References

Further reading 
 Schileyko A. A. (2003). "Treatise on recent terrestrial pulmonate mollusks. 10. Ariophantidae, Ostracolethaidae, Ryssotidae, Milacidae, Dyakiidae, Staffordiidae, Gastrodontidae, Zonitidae, Daudebardiidae, Parmacellidae". Ruthenica, Supplement 2. 1309-1466.

External links